Atif Akin (born in 1979, Bandırma, Turkey) is an artist and designer living in New York City. Akin studied engineering and design at Middle East Technical University in Ankara, Turkey. Over the past ten years, he has been teaching in Istanbul, Europe, and the US. Since 2011, he has been Assistant Professor of Visual Arts at the Mason Gross School of the Arts at Rutgers University. Akin’s work examines science, nature, mobility, and politics through contemporary media.

His work is listed in the Younger Than Jesus art directory project of the New Museum.

In 2009, Akin co-curated a large-scale exhibition in SantralIstanbul called Uncharted: User Frames in Media Arts, and edited an accompanying book.

Akin was the recipient of the 2015 apexart Franchise Program  award in New York, and the organizer of the zine project and exhibition, Apricots from Damascus, co-produced and hosted by SALT (institution) in Istanbul. In 2016, he participated in the Greenlight Project  hosted by Francesca von Habsburg’s TBA21, alongside Olafur Eliasson.

References

External links 
 http://atifakin.info/

Turkish designers
1979 births
Living people
People from Bandırma
Middle East Technical University alumni